Disney Channel is an Israeli children's television channel owned by Disney International Operations broadcast to Israeli audiences. It was previously known as Fox Kids and Jetix. It launched in its current form on 9 September 2009.

History
Fox Kids began broadcasting in Israel in February 2001, and mainly broadcast animated programming aimed towards children. Fox Kids was later rebranded to Jetix in March 2005. On 9 September 2009, Jetix was replaced with Disney Channel. Disney Channel mainly aired programming from its US counterpart, as well as local content such as Balagan. In 2011, its sister, Disney Junior, was launched on Yes, and later on HOT on 27 November 2013.

Programming

Current programming

Live-action

Animated

Reruns/ended series
 As The Bell Rings (Israeli version)
 Austin & Ally (March 9, 2012 – present)
 Best Friends Whenever (February 17, 2016 – present)
 Bizaardvark (November 2, 2016 - present)
 Crash & Bernstein (January 1, 2013 – present)
 Dog With a Blog (February 18, 2013 – present)
 Good Luck Charlie
 Girl Meets World (December 25, 2014 – present)
 Gravity Falls (November 1, 2012 – present)
 H2O: Just Add Water
 Handy Manny
 Hannah Montana
 I Didn't Do It (May 8, 2014 – present)
 Jessie (June 19, 2012 – present)
 K.C. Undercover (July 7, 2015 - present)
 Kickin' It (2012 - present)
 Kid vs. Kat
 Kirby Buckets (February 25, 2015 - present)
 Lab Rats (2012 – present)
 Lab Rats: Elite Force (November 19, 2016 - February 25, 2017)
 Liv and Maddie (August 26, 2013 - present)
 Mighty Med (August 2014 – present)
 My Babysitter's a Vampire (November 7, 2011 – present)
 North Star (November 30, 2016 – present) 
 Pair of Kings (August 11, 2011 – present)
 Randy Cunningham: 9th Grade Ninja (March 17, 2013 – present)
 Shake It Up (July 18, 2011 – present)
 Shavit Ventura's Show (May 28, 2012 – present) 
 Soy Luna (May 22, 2016 - January 3, 2019)
 The Suite Life on Deck
 Stuck in the Middle (July 4, 2016 - present)
 Summer Break Stories (August 19, 2012 – present) 
 Violetta (September 3, 2012 – present)
 Wander Over Yonder (September 1, 2014 – present)
 Wizards Of Waverly Place
 Yoni & The Geeks

From Disney Junior
 Doc McStuffins
 Bluey (February 25, 2022 – present)
 Mickey and the Roadster Racers (July 29, 2017 – present)
 Mickey Mouse Clubhouse
 Miles from Tomorrowland (May 15, 2015 – present)
 Mira, Royal Detective
 Puppy Dog Pals (February 12, 2018 – present)
 Pikwik Pack
 Sofia the First (March 22, 2013 – present)
 Elena of Avalor (December 23, 2016 – present)
 Vampirina (July 27, 2018 – present)
 Muppet Babies (January 20, 2019 – present)
 Alice's Wonderland Bakery (September 23, 2022 – present)

Movies
 16 Wishes (November 18, 2010)
 Adventures in Babysitting (July 7, 2016)
 Avalon High (February 3, 2011)
 Bad Hair Day (March 26, 2015)
 Camp Rock 2: The Final Jam (September 16, 2010)
 Cloud 9 (February 20, 2014)
 Den Brother
 Descendants (August 31, 2015)
 Descendants 2 (August 31, 2017)
 Descendants 3 (October 18, 2019)
 Freaky Friday (August 30, 2018)
 Frenemies
 Geek Charming (March 22, 2012)
 Girl vs. Monster (December 9, 2012)
 Good Luck Charlie, It's Christmas! (January 27, 2012)
 How to Build a Better Boy (October 23, 2014)
 Invisible Sister (December 10, 2015)
 Lemonade Mouth (April 28, 2011)
 Let It Shine
 My Babysitter's a Vampire (November 6, 2011)
 Phineas and Ferb the Movie: Across the 2nd Dimension (October 28, 2011)
 Princess Protection Program (September 9, 2009)
 Radio Rebel (July 19, 2012)
 Sharpay's Fabulous Adventure
 The Suite Life Movie (July 28, 2011)
 The Swap (December 29, 2016)
 Teen Beach 2 (July 2, 2015)
 Teen Beach Movie (August 26, 2013)
 StarStruck (May 13, 2010)
 Wizards of Waverly Place: The Movie
 Zapped (August 31, 2014)
 Zombies (March 29, 2018)

Former programming

Fox Kids

Original Productions 
 Balagan (Israeli show)
 Balagan to Eilat (Israeli show)
 Comi Comi (Israeli show)
 Gur and Oach (Israeli show)

Animated series 

 Action Man
 Angela Anaconda
 Argai: The Prophecy
 The Avengers: United They Stand
 Bad Dog
 Beverly Hills Teens
 Biker Mice from Mars
 Bob in a Bottle
 Bobby's World
 Braceface
 Bureau of Alien Detectors
 Butt-Ugly Martians
 Camp Candy
 Care Bears (DiC episodes)
 COPS
 Creepy Crawlers
 Da Möb
 Dennis the Menace
 Diabolik
 Digimon: Digital Monsters
 Digimon: Digital Monsters (season 2)
 Digimon: Digital Monsters (season 3)
 Digimon: Digital Monsters (season 4)
 Dinozaurs
 Doraemon (1979)
 Dungeons & Dragons
 Eagle Riders
 Eek! The Cat
 Flint the Time Detective
 Freaky Stories
 Gadget and the Gadgetinis
 Grimm's Fairy Tale Classics
 Hamtaro
 Happy Ness: The Secret of the Loch
 Heathcliff
 Honeybee Hutch
 Huckleberry Finn
 The Incredible Hulk
 Inspector Gadget
 Iron Man
 Iznogoud
 Jason and the Heroes of Mount Olympus
 Jim Button
 Jin Jin and the Panda Patrol
 Journey to the Heart of the World
 Kidd Video
 The Kids from Room 402 
 Let's Go Quintuplets
 Life with Louie
 The Littl' Bits
 The Little Flying Bears
 The Littles
 Little Mouse on the Prairie
 Macron 1
 Mad Jack the Pirate
 Martin Mystery
 Medabots
 Mega Babies
 MegaMan: NT Warrior
 Mon Colle Knights
 The Moonkys
 My Favorite Fairy Tales
 My Little Pony
 NASCAR Racers
 Ovide and the Gang
 Pecola
 Pocket Dragon Adventures
 Princess Sissi
 Peter Pan & the Pirates
 Pig City
 Pigs Next Door
 Pucca (shorts)
 The Ripping Friends
 RoboRoach 
 Saban's Adventures of the Little Mermaid
 Saban's Adventures of Oliver Twist
 Saban's Adventures of Peter Pan
 Saban's Adventures of Pinocchio
 Saban's Around the World in Eighty Dreams
 Saban's Gulliver's Travels
 Samurai Pizza Cats
 The Secret Files of the Spy Dogs
 Shaman King
 Sharky & George
 Shinzo
 Silver Surfer
 The Smurfs (episodes 1-100,153-200)
 Snorks
 Sonic X
 Space Strikers
 Spider-Man 5000
 Spider-Man
 Spider-Man Unlimited 
 The Super Mario Bros. Super Show!
 Super Pig
 Sylvanian Families
 Tenko and the Guardians of the Magic
 The Tick
 Totally Spies!
 Transformers: Generation 2
 Transformers: Robots in Disguise
 Transformers: Armada
 Tutenstein 
 Walter Melon
 What's with Andy?
 The Why Why Family
 Wowser
 Wunschpunsch
 X-Men
 Xyber 9: New Dawn

Live Action series

 Bailey Kipper's P.O.V.
 Big Bad Beetleborgs
 Beetleborgs Metallix
 Big Wolf on Campus
 Black Hole High
 Breaker High
 Eerie, Indiana
 Even Stevens
 Floricienta
 Galidor: Defenders of the Outer Dimension
 Goosebumps
 Lizzie McGuire
 Masked Rider 
 Mighty Morphin Power Rangers (reruns)
 Moolah Beach
 Mystic Knights of Tir Na Nog
 The New Addams Family
 Ninja Turtles: The Next Mutation
 Power Rangers Zeo (reruns)
 Power Rangers Turbo (reruns)
 Power Rangers in Space (reruns)
 Power Rangers Lost Galaxy (reruns)
 Power Rangers Lightspeed Rescue
 Power Rangers Time Force
 Power Rangers Wild Force
 Power Rangers Ninja Storm
 Radio Active
 Real Scary Stories
 Rebelde Way 
 So Little Time
 State of Grace
 Sweet Valley High
 VR Troopers
 The Zack Files

Jetix

Animated series

 A.T.O.M.
 Battle B-Daman
 Bobobo-bo Bo-bobo
 Captain Flamingo
 Combo Niños
 Daigunder
 Galactik Football
 Get Ed
 Grossology
 Iggy Arbuckle
 Kid vs. Kat 
 Monster Buster Club
 One Piece (episodes 1-52)
 Oban Star Racers
 Planet Sketch
 Pokémon DP: Battle Dimension (seasons 11-12)
 Pucca
 Shaolin Wuzang
 Shuriken School
 Super Robot Monkey Team Hyperforce Go!
 Team Galaxy
 The Tofus
 Transformers: Cybertron
 Transformers: Animated
 Viewtiful Joe
 W.I.T.C.H.
 Yin Yang Yo!
 Zombie Hotel

Live Action series

 H2O: Just Add Water
 Monster Warriors
 Power Rangers Dino Thunder
 Power Rangers S.P.D.
 Power Rangers Mystic Force
 Power Rangers Operation Overdrive
 Power Rangers Jungle Fury

Toon Disney block

 Aladdin 
 American Dragon: Jake Long
 Buzz Lightyear of Star Command 
 Kim Possible
 The Legend of Tarzan
 Lilo & Stitch: The Series
 Phineas and Ferb

Disney Channel Weekend Block

 Aaron Stone
 As the Bell Rings
 Cory in the House
 Hannah Montana
 Jonas Brothers: Living the Dream
 The Suite Life on Deck
 Wizards of Waverly Place

Disney Channel

Animated series

 A.N.T. Farm
 Billy Dilley's Super-Duper Subterranean Summer
 Brandy & Mr. Whiskers
 Cars Toons 
 Doraemon (2005)
 The Emperor's New School
 The Fairly OddParents (season 1-5)
 Fish Hooks 
 Have a Laugh!
 Jimmy Two-Shoes
 Numb Chucks
 Rated A for Awesome 
 The Replacements
 Sabrina: Secrets of a Teenage Witch

Marvel Universe block

 The Avengers: Earth's Mightiest Heroes
 The Super Hero Squad Show

Disney Junior block

 101 Dalmatians: The Series
 Handy Manny
 Jungle Junction
 The Lion Guard
 Lilo & Stitch: The Series
 Little Einsteins
 The Little Mermaid
 My Friends Tigger & Pooh
 Special Agent Oso
 Timon & Pumbaa 
 Sheriff Callie's Wild West

References

External links

 Disney Channel Israel 

Israel
Children's television networks
Television channels in Israel
Israel
Television channels and stations established in 2001
2001 establishments in Israel